Ravno Brdo is a dispersed settlement in the hills east of Ljubljana in Slovenia. It belongs to the City Municipality of Ljubljana. It is part of the traditional region of Lower Carniola, and it is now included with the rest of the municipality in the Central Slovenia Statistical Region.

Cultural heritage
A church dedicated to Saint Bartholomew formerly stood in the hamlet of Hribar and served parishioners in the Besnica Valley. In addition to the ruins of the church, the location is also an archaeological site with graves from the late Roman era.

References

External links

Ravno Brdo on Geopedia

Populated places in the City Municipality of Ljubljana
Sostro District